Herbert Muschel, was an American businessman and publisher. In 1954, he founded PR Newswire, which was a cutting edge service that once distributed corporate financial news at a time when the Federal Communications Commission allowed only AT&T and Western Union to send printed messages to a third person. With this direct-to-the-newsroom service, press releases were treated as breaking news for the first time. He died on November 1, 2003 at 85.

External links 
 Obituary in the New York Times

Year of birth missing
2003 deaths
American publishers (people)